Oleg I may refer to:

Oleg I of Chernigov (d. 1115)
Oleg I of Ryazan (d. 1258)